The Football Federation Victoria National Training Centre (FFV NTC) is run by Football Federation Australia and Football Federation Victoria, in Melbourne, for Victorian youth players. Up to 2010 it was run by the Victorian Institute of Sport.

Program
The men's program aims to prepare players for selection in the Australia U17 squad and FFA Centre of Excellence program. Between 20 and 25 scholarships are awarded each year to athletes who are 13–17 years old that show the potential to represent Australia at U-17 level.

The team competes regularly in the National Premier Leagues Victoria Under 18 East division, which acts as preparation for the FFA National Institute Challenge in December of each year.

Recent history
The NTC squad, led by coach Boris Seroshtan won its first National Institute Challenge in December 2013 without losing a single game, finishing six points clear of Football New South Wales NTC.

Several players of that squad have since graduated the program to sign for different clubs including Melbourne Victory and Melbourne City FC. One of the star performers, Jake Brimmer has since gone on to sign for English football giants Liverpool F.C., as well as making nine appearances for the Australian Under-17s squad.

Despite losing the core of its squad for the 2014 edition of the National Institute Challenge, the Victoria NTC defied the odds to win a second consecutive title, losing only once on its way to beating Queensland Academy of Sport by two points.

Current technical staff

Notable former players

References

External links
Official website 
U-21 Victorian Premier League 2009 results

Soccer in Victoria (Australia)